Piz Arlos is a mountain in the Oberhalbstein Range, located near Savognin in Graubünden, Switzerland.

External links
 List of mountains above 2000 m in Switzerland with coordinates

Mountains of the Alps
Mountains of Switzerland
Mountains of Graubünden
Surses